The Man In The Bowler Hat is the third album by the British rock group Stackridge.  The album was produced by George Martin at AIR Studios, London and released in the UK by MCA Records.  This was their highest charting album, peaking at number 23 in the UK Albums Chart.

A different version of the album was released by Sire Records in the US and Canada under the title  Pinafore Days.  The US album removed two songs and replaced them with two others (produced by Tony Ashton) from the UK version of the next Stackridge album Extravaganza. Although the front cover was the same, the jacket photos were changed to show the Extravaganza lineup. Pinafore Days was the only US chart entry for Stackridge, reaching number 191 on the Billboard 200 albums chart.

Track listing 
All songs credited to Andy Davis, Smegmakovitch except where noted.

Side one
"Fundamentally Yours" 
"Pinafore Days"
"The Last Plimsoll"
"To the Sun and the Moon" (Mutter Slater, Peter Denman)
"The Road to Venezuela"

Side two
"The Galloping Gaucho"
"Humiliation" (James Warren)
"Dangerous Bacon" (Warren, Smegmakovitch)
"The Indifferent Hedgehog" (Davis, Graham Smith)
"God Speed the Plough" (Wabadaw Sleeve)

Track listing: U.S. version "Pinafore Days", Sire Records SASD-7503
All songs credited to Andy Davis, Smegmakovitch except where noted.
"Fundamentally Yours"
"Pinafore Days"
"The Last Plimsoll"
"Spin 'Round The Room" (Rod Bowkett, Lucy Vernon)
"The Road To Venezuela"
"The Galloping Gaucho"
"Humiliation" (Warren)
"Dangerous Bacon" (Warren, Smegmakovitch)
"One Rainy July Morning" (original title: "Highbury Incident (Rainy July Morning)") (Davis, Slater, Bowkett)
"God Speed The Plough" (Sleeve)

Bonus tracks on the 1996 CD re-issue on Demon Records
"Do the Stanley" (single) (Davis, Warren, Slater, Crun Walter)
"C'est la Vie" (b-side) (Davis, Warren)
"Let There Be Lids" (first released in the UK compilation album Do The Stanley) (traditional)

Personnel
Andy Cresswell-Davis - guitars, vocals, keyboards, percussion
James Warren - guitars, vocals
Michael 'Mutter' Slater - flute, vocals, keyboards, percussion
Mike Evans - violin, vocals
Jim "Crun" Walter - bass guitar
Billy Bent (aka Billy Sparkle) - drums

Additional personnel
Reg Leopold - violin
William Reid - violin
Graeme Scott - viola
Vivian Joseph - cello
Jack Emblow - accordion
Ray Davies - trumpet/cornet
Derek Taylor - french horn and solo on "To the Sun and the Moon"
B. Lamb - trombone
M. Fry - tuba
R. Chamberlain - clarinet/saxes
Andy Mackay - sax on "Dangerous Bacon"

Production
George Martin - production, orchestration and piano on "Humiliation" and "The Indifferent Hedgehog"

Other credits
Bill Price - engineering
John Kosh - cover design
John Swannell - cover photography
AIR London - studios
Big Ben Music/Christchurch Music - publishing

References

Stackridge albums
1974 albums
Albums produced by George Martin
Albums recorded at AIR Studios